Kon Plông is a rural district (huyện) of Kon Tum province in the Central Highlands region of Vietnam. It covers an area of 2,248.2 km² and in 1999 had a population of 31,700 people. The district capital lies at Măng Đen.

Divisions
Kon Plông district was formed on the basis of division separating the old district of Kon Plông into Kon Rẫy district and the new Kon Plông district. Kon Plông district was divided in 2019 into 1 township and 8 communes, including:

 Măng Đen township (former Đăk Long commune)
 Măng Bút
 Măng Cành
 Ngọc Tem
 Đăk Rinh
 Đăk Nên
 Đăk Tăng
 Xã Hiếu
 Pờ Ê

As of 2003 the district had a population of 18,554.

References

Districts of Kon Tum province